Baby is a 2020 Spanish psychological thriller film with gothic tale themes directed by Juanma Bajo Ulloa. It features no lines of spoken dialogue. It stars Rosie Day, Harriet Sansom Harris, and Natalia Tena.

Plot 
A drug-addicted woman sells her baby and then tries to get them back.

Cast

Production 
Baby is a Frágil Zinema and La Charito Films production. It had support from the Basque Government, Diputación Foral de Álava, Ayuntamiento de Vitoria-Gasteiz, and RTVE. Filming began on 5 August 2020 and wrapped by mid September 2020.

Release 
The film was presented at the 53rd Sitges Film Festival in October 2020. It also screened at the Valladolid International Film Festival, the Tallinn Black Nights Film Festival, and the Cairo Film Festival. Distributed by Festival Films, it was theatrically released in Spain on 18 December 2020.

Reception 
Wendy Ide of ScreenDaily deemed the film to be "a macabre psychological thriller which contains no spoken dialogue, but which delves into its cruelly capricious fantasy world through creative sound design, expressive performances from an all-female cast, and extensive use of fake cobwebs".

Quim Casas of El Periódico de Catalunya rated the film 3 out of 5 stars, deeming it to be "an unsatisfactory work, but not negligible. It is an impossible film, extreme and histrionic, but at the same time necessary".

Daniel de Partearroyo of Cinemanía rated the film 5 out of 5 stars, deeming it to be "another piece of goldsmithing by Bajo Ulloa that leaves you speechless".

Raquel Hernández Luján of HobbyConsolas rated the film 65 out of 100 points ("acceptable"), assessing that it is "a very particular film, baroque and excessive", with both brilliant and uninspiring moments, also considering that the script is not well achieved and it sometimes is either confusing or bordering on the ridiculous.

Fausto Fernández of Fotogramas rated the film 4 out of 5 stars, considering that it manages to "reinvent the codes of 1970s horror-genre films".

Accolades 

|-
| rowspan = "4" align = "center" | 2021 || 8th Feroz Awards || Best Original Music || Koldo Uriarte, Bingen Mendizábal ||  || 
|-
| rowspan = "2" | 35th Goya Awards || Best Director || Juanma Bajo Ulloa ||  || rowspan = "2" | 
|-
| Best Original Score || Bingen Mendizábal, Koldo Uriarte || 
|-
| 13th Gaudí Awards || Best Cinematography || Josep M. Civit ||  || 
|}

See also 
 List of Spanish films of 2020

References 

2020s Spanish films
2020 psychological thriller films
Films shot in the Basque Country (autonomous community)
Films without speech
Spanish psychological thriller films